Thomas R. Ahlersmeyer (born April 23, 1954)  is a Lutheran educator and minister with the Lutheran Church–Missouri Synod in the United States. From 2005 to 2009, he was the president of Concordia University, Ann Arbor, Michigan and was previously interim president. He presently serves as senior pastor of Holy Cross Lutheran Church and School in Fort Wayne, Indiana. Previous to Ann Arbor, Ahlersmeyer was the executive director of the Cleveland Lutheran High Schools.

External links
 Biography at Concordia University Ann Arbor website

20th-century American Lutheran clergy
People from Ann Arbor, Michigan
Living people
Concordia University Ann Arbor
1954 births
Lutheran Church–Missouri Synod people
21st-century American Lutheran clergy